ComicsAlliance was an American website dedicated to covering the comic book industry as well as comic-related media, and is owned by Townsquare Media. The site has been nominated for multiple awards including a 2015 Eisner Award win in the category Best Comics Periodical/Journalism.

History

ComicsAlliance was established in 2007 as part of an online network of sites owned by AOL, and run by editors-in-chief John Anderson and Chris Dooley. The site featured writing from critics including David Brothers, Andy Khouri, Caleb Goellner and Chris Sims. Laura Hudson became the editor-in-chief in 2009. In 2012 Hudson left the site, with former Vertigo Comics editor Joe Hughes later announced as the new editor-in-chief.

On April 26, 2013, ComicsAlliance and the AOL Music properties were abruptly shut down. On June 2, 2013, AOL sold ComicsAlliance and several of the AOL Music blogs to Townsquare Media, with editors Joe Hughes, Andy Khouri, and Caleb Goellner remaining in position on the site.

In 2015 the site was the recipient of an Eisner Award in the category Best Comics Periodical/Journalism.

In April 2017, ComicsAlliance was placed on hiatus by Townsquare Media and the most recent editorial staff was dissolved.

In July 2021, Comics Alliance had new content posted on its site and social media accounts but there was no new content published since then.

Regular features
The longest-running column on the site is Ask Chris, written by Chris Sims, which has run on the site since 2010. In 2011, Sims was featured on The Daily Show as part of a feature on the Batman comics series, credited as a 'Batmanologist'. Additional features of note for the site have included Kate or Die, a regular comic from cartoonist Kate Leth; as well as Best Art Ever (This Week), a weekly feature showcasing new comics-related art. The podcasts War Rocket Ajax and The Arkham Sessions have both been serialised on the site.

References

External links
 ComicsAlliance official website

Websites about comics
American entertainment news websites
Internet properties disestablished in 2017